Tamerlan Kimovich Aguzarov (14 June 1963 – 19 February 2016) was a Russian politician who was the head of North Ossetia-Alania from 2015 until his death in 2016.

From 1999 to 2011 was Chairman of the Supreme Court of North Ossetia-Alania.

References

External links
 Официальный сайт Правительства Республики Северная Осетия — Алания

1963 births
2016 deaths
People from Alagirsky District
Ossetian people
Communist Party of the Soviet Union members
United Russia politicians
21st-century Russian politicians
Heads of North Ossetia–Alania
Heads of the federal subjects of Russia who died in office
Deaths from pneumonia in Russia
Sixth convocation members of the State Duma (Russian Federation)